Nemapogon alticolella is a moth of the family Tineidae. It is found in Austria.

References

Moths described in 1961
Nemapogoninae